Bob Cranford was a vocalist and harmonica player for the late 1920s and early 1930s string band, The Red Fox Chasers.

References

Year of birth missing
Year of death missing
American male singers
American harmonica players